Federico Insúa (born January 3, 1980) is an Argentine retired footballer who played 14 times for the Argentina national team. Usually a playmaker, he is well known for his vision and technique.

Club career

Early years
Nicknamed El Pocho, Insúa grew up in a middle-class family in Buenos Aires. He moved to the youth teams of Argentinos Juniors from the Club Parque youth team, and debuted professionally on November 18, 1997. After five seasons with the club, he transferred to Independiente in 2002. After winning a local championship with Independiente, he moved to Spanish first division Málaga CF in 2003, but after only one unsuccessful season he returned to Independiente.

Boca Juniors
At the beginning of the 2005–06 season, Insúa again transferred, this time to Boca Juniors. He debuted for Boca in a 4–1 victory over Gimnasia de Jujuy. Even though he had a slow start, he succeeded in becoming Boca's playmaker, helping the team to win two league titles and two international cups by the end of 2006.

Germany and Mexico
On July 28, 2006, Insúa transferred for €4 million to German Bundesliga side Borussia Mönchengladbach, which hoped to fill a gap in its offensive midfield. The 26-year-old midfielder put pen to paper on a four-year deal. The Argentine international wore the number 10 shirt for Borussia. On February 3, 2007, he scored his first Bundesliga goal in a game against Arminia Bielefeld.

After the relegation of Borussia in the 2006–07 Bundesliga, he was sold to Club América (Mexico) for US$7.5 million, for four years, with a salary of US$1,875,000 a year. He joined the squad on June 27, 2007. On July 27, 2008 Insúa opened the 1–0 score against Santos Laguna on the first match of the Apertua 2008 season. In early January 2009 he was loaned to Necaxa, but he could not help the team avoid relegation.

On July 18, 2009, Insúa was loaned to Boca Juniors for one year. Once the loan finished, he signed with Bursaspor to a two-year deal on June 17, 2010.

Return to Argentina
Insúa returned to Argentina for the 2012 Clausura, joining Vélez Sársfield. With Vélez he obtained his fourth Argentine league title (with three different teams) after helping his team to win the 2012 Inicial, starting all 19 games and scoring once. He also won with Vélez the 2012–13 Superfinal and helped the team to a semi-finalist campaign in the 2013 Copa Sudamericana.

In January 2014, the attacking midfielder returned to Independiente when the team was playing in the Primera B Nacional. He signed an 18-month contract with the club. He played few matches in the tournament mostly as a substitute and the team was promoted back to the first division at the end of the season. He couldn't gain a single minute of play with new manager Jorge Almirón and in October 2014 he was fired by president Hugo Moyano.

Millonarios
At the end of 2014 Insúa was hired by Colombian team Millonarios to start playing in the 2015 Categoría Primera A season.

International career
Insúa debuted for the Argentina national football team in January 2003 and played for them on a sporadic basis over the following years.

National team statistics

Honours
Independiente
Argentine Primera División (1): 2002 Apertura

Boca Juniors
Argentine Primera División (2): 2005 Apertura, 2006 Clausura
Copa Sudamericana (1): 2005
Recopa Sudamericana (1): 2005

Club América
InterLiga (1): 2008

Vélez Sársfield
Argentine Primera División (2): 2012 Inicial, 2012–13 Superfinal

References

External links
 Argentine Primera statistics at Fútbol XXI  
 Guardian statistics
 

1980 births
Living people
Footballers from Buenos Aires
Argentine footballers
Argentine expatriate footballers
Argentine expatriate sportspeople in Spain
Argentinos Juniors footballers
Club Atlético Independiente footballers
Boca Juniors footballers
Argentina international footballers
Argentina under-20 international footballers
La Liga players
Málaga CF players
Bundesliga players
Borussia Mönchengladbach players
Bursaspor footballers
Club América footballers
Club Atlético Vélez Sarsfield footballers
Argentine Primera División players
Süper Lig players
Categoría Primera A players
Liga MX players
Expatriate footballers in Germany
Expatriate footballers in Mexico
Expatriate footballers in Spain
Expatriate footballers in Turkey
Expatriate footballers in Colombia
Association football midfielders